Jacques Henri Marie Maillet (7 September 1926 – 30 January 2019) was a French rower. He competed at the 1948 Summer Olympics in London with the men's double sculls where they were eliminated in the semi-final.

References

1926 births
2019 deaths
French male rowers
Olympic rowers of France
Rowers at the 1948 Summer Olympics
Rowers at the 1952 Summer Olympics
People from Asnières-sur-Seine
Sportspeople from Hauts-de-Seine
European Rowing Championships medalists